Koopmann is a surname. Notable people with the surname include:

Erwin Koopmann, recipient of Knight's Cross of the Iron Cross
Jörg Koopmann (born 1968), German photographer
Karl Koopmann or Karl Koppmann (died 1905), German historian, archivist, authority on the Hanseatic League
Pascal Koopmann (born 1990), German footballer

See also
Koopman